Plantago media, known as the hoary plantain, is a species of flowering plant in the plantain family Plantaginaceae. It is native to central and western Europe, including Great Britain and introduced to parts of the north-east United States. Its generic name is derived from the Latin for sole; like other members of the genus Plantago, it should not be confused with the unrelated plantain, a starchy banana.

Description

Plantago media grows in damp grassy meadows up to an altitude of 2000 m. A slender stalk of between 5 and 50 cm develops from a basal rosette of finely-haired leaves. Delicate pink-white flowers are borne between May and September. P. media is hermaphrodite and is pollinated by wind or insects, particularly bees.

Distribution and habitat
Plantago media is native to Eurasia. It is native to eastern England, but scarce in Scotland and Ireland. It is calcicole, characteristic of soils on chalk or limestone, growing in grassland, meadows, lawns and waste places.

Uses
The plant is edible. Archeological finds testify to its use during the Roman era in Britain.

References

media
Medicinal plants
Flora of France
Flora of China
Flora of Denmark
Flora of Estonia
Flora of Finland
Flora of Germany
Flora of Greece
Flora of Iran
Flora of Italy
Flora of Latvia
Flora of Lithuania
Flora of Norway
Flora of Romania
Flora of Russia
Flora of Spain
Flora of Turkey
Flora of the United Kingdom
Plants described in 1753
Taxa named by Carl Linnaeus